Sofa Landver (born 28 October 1949) is an Israeli politician who served as a member of the Knesset for Yisrael Beiteinu and as the country's Minister of Aliyah and Integration.

Biography
Born in Leningrad in the Soviet Union (today Saint Petersburg in Russia), Landver made aliyah (immigrated) to Israel in 1979. She served on Ashdod city council, has been director with the Ashdod Development Company, and a member of the Jewish Agency's board of trustees.

In the 1996 elections she was elected to the Knesset on the Labor Party list. She was re-elected in 1999 and served as Deputy Minister of Transportation between 12 August and 2 November 2002. She lost her seat in the 
2003 elections, but entered the Knesset on 11 January 2006 as a replacement for Avraham Shochat. However, she resigned on 8 February, and was replaced by Orna Angel.

Prior to the 2006 elections Landver joined Yisrael Beiteinu, and was placed seventh on its list. The party won 11 seats and she retained her place in the Knesset. She was re-elected again in the 2009 elections after winning fifth place on the party's list. On 31 March she was appointed Minister of Immigrant Absorption.

She was re-elected again in 2013 and retained her place in the cabinet. Although she retained her seat in the 2015 elections, Yisrael Beiteinu did not join the coalition government and Landver lost her ministerial portfolio. However, after the party rejoined the government in May 2016, she was again appointed Minister of Immigrant Absorption, with the ministry renamed in 2017 to become the Ministry of Aliyah and Integration.

Landver currently lives in Ashdod, and is widowed, with one daughter.

References

External links

1949 births
Russian Jews
Soviet emigrants to Israel
Women members of the Knesset
People from Ashdod
Living people
One Israel politicians
Israeli Labor Party politicians
Yisrael Beiteinu politicians
Members of the 14th Knesset (1996–1999)
Members of the 15th Knesset (1999–2003)
Members of the 16th Knesset (2003–2006)
Members of the 17th Knesset (2006–2009)
Members of the 18th Knesset (2009–2013)
Members of the 19th Knesset (2013–2015)
Members of the 20th Knesset (2015–2019)
Deputy ministers of Israel
21st-century Israeli women politicians
20th-century Israeli women politicians
Women government ministers of Israel
Deputy Speakers of the Knesset